The Man Next Door may refer to:

The Man Next Door (novel), 1943 American spy thriller by Mignon G. Eberhart
The Man Next Door (1923) film), American silent comedy drama film directed by Victor Schertzinger
The Man Next Door (1996 film), American TV-film directed by Lamont Johnson
The Man Next Door (1997 film), American film starring Karen Carlson
The Man Next Door (2010 film), Argentine film